Gamela (Gamella, Acobu, Barbados)  Curinsi or Acobu, is an unclassified and presumably extinct language of the Maranhão region of Northeastern Brazil. It was originally spoken along the Itapecuru River, Turiaçu River, and Pindaré River, with ethnic descendants reported to be living in Cabo and Vianna in Maranhão State.

Kaufman (1994) said that 'only Greenberg dares to classify this language', due to the lack of data on it.

This is presumably the Gamela language of Viana for which 19 words are recorded in Nimuendajú (1937:68).

Other varieties
Below are other extinct varieties, many of which have no data, that may have been related to Gamela.

Arañí - once spoken between the Parnaíba River and Itapecuru River
Puti (Poti) - once spoken at the mouth of the Poti River (unattested)
Anapurú - once spoken on the right bank of the Parnaíba River (unattested)
Uruati - extinct language from the mouth of the Munim River, Maranhão
Cururi - extinct language of the neighbors of the Uruati tribe
Guanare - once spoken between the Itapecuru River and Parnaíba River (unattested)
Coroatá - once spoken on the Itapecuru River, Maranhão (unattested)
Guaxina - once spoken at the mouth of the Itapecuru River (unattested)
Curinsi - an extinct dialect of the Gamela once spoken near Vianna
Tacarijú - once spoken on the Longá River in the state of Piauí (unattested)

Vocabulary
Loukotka (1968) gives three words in Gamela:
kokeáto 'pot'
kyoipé 'tree'
anéno 'tobacco'

Gamella of Viana words recorded by Nimuendajú (1937:68) from his informant Maria Cafuza in Viana, Maranhão:

{| class="wikitable sortable"
! gloss !! Gamella of Viana
|-
| fire || tatá (< Tupi)
|-
| penis || purú
|-
| vulva || sebú
|-
| Negro || katú-brohó
|-
| White? Indian? || katú-koyaká
|-
| brother-in-law || múisi
|-
| pot || kokeáto
|-
| gourd bowl || kutubé
|-
| club || tamarána (< Tupi)
|-
| knife || kasapó
|-
| jaguar || yopopó
|-
| monkey || kokói (< Timbira)
|-
| horse || pohoné
|-
| cattle || azutí
|-
| domestic fowl || kureːká
|-
| tree || kyoipé
|-
| tobacco || anéno
|-
| pepper || birizu
|-
| thick || tomabéto
|}

References

Bibliography

 

Indigenous languages of Northeastern Brazil
Maranhão
Extinct languages of South America
Unclassified languages of South America